Eitan Azaria (born May 12, 1983) is an Israeli retired footballer and Football Mental Consultant.

Azaria was a reserve on the Maccabi Haifa Israeli championship teams in 2001 and 2002, coached by Avram Grant. Grant would later go on to use a mental programme developed by Azaria in his coaching.

Azaria converted two penalty kicks in an Israeli Cup penalty shootout against Maccabi Petah-Tikva in 2006. Azaria's side Maccabi Herzliya lost 13-12.

References

External links
 Eitan Azaria's Football Mental Coaching site
Profile of Eitan Azaria on Maccabi Haifa's official website

1983 births
Living people
Israeli Jews
Israeli footballers
Maccabi Haifa F.C. players
Hapoel Ramat Gan F.C. players
Hapoel Haifa F.C. players
Maccabi Herzliya F.C. players
Bnei Sakhnin F.C. players
Hapoel Acre F.C. players
Israeli Premier League players
Liga Leumit players
Israeli people of Moroccan-Jewish descent
Association football defenders